Madagascarctia is a genus of moths in the subfamily Arctiinae from Madagascar. The genus was erected by Vladimir Viktorovitch Dubatolov in 2006.
As per David T. Goodger and Allan Watson (1995) the species of this genus have whitish wings speckled with brown.

Species
 Madagascarctia adelinae (Toulgoët, 1991)
 Madagascarctia cellularis (Toulgoët, 1954)
 Madagascarctia feminina (Rothschild, 1933)
 Madagascarctia madagascariensis (Butler, 1882)
 Madagascarctia madagascariensis sparsipuncta (Hampson, 1901)

References

Dubatolov, V. V. (2006). "New genera and species of Arctiinae from the Afrotropical fauna (Lepidoptera: Arctiidae)". Nachrichten des entomologische Vereins Apollo. 27 (3): 139–152.

Spilosomina
Moth genera